Aşkın Tuna (born 21 July 1940) is a Turkish athlete. He competed in the men's triple jump at the 1964 Summer Olympics and the 1968 Summer Olympics.

References

1940 births
Living people
Athletes (track and field) at the 1964 Summer Olympics
Athletes (track and field) at the 1968 Summer Olympics
Turkish male triple jumpers
Olympic athletes of Turkey
Sportspeople from Manisa